UFC Fight Night: Lee vs. Oliveira  (also known as  UFC Fight Night 170 and  UFC on ESPN+ 28) was a mixed martial arts event produced by the Ultimate Fighting Championship that took place on March 14, 2020 at Ginásio Nilson Nelson in Brasília, Brazil.

Background
A lightweight bout between former interim UFC Lightweight Championship challenger Kevin Lee and Charles Oliveira served as the event headliner.

A middleweight bout between Brad Tavares and The Ultimate Fighter: Brazil 3 heavyweight winner Antônio Carlos Júnior was scheduled for the event. However, Tavares was forced to pull out of the fight due to an anterior cruciate ligament (ACL) injury. He was replaced by Makhmud Muradov. In turn, Júnior suffered an unspecified injury and the bout was cancelled from the event.

A women's strawweight bout between Paige VanZant and Amanda Ribas was scheduled for the event. However, VanZant was forced to pull out of the fight due to an undisclosed injury. VanZant requested to reschedule the bout one month later, but Ribas decided to remain at the event and Randa Markos stepped in as the replacement.

A flyweight bout between Su Mudaerji and Bruno Gustavo da Silva was scheduled for the event. However, due to the COVID-19 pandemic in mainland China, Mudaerji was forced to withdraw from the event as he would not travel to prepare for the fight and was replaced by promotional newcomer David Dvořák.

At the weigh-ins, Lee weighed in at 158.5 lb, 2.5 lb over the lightweight non-title fight limit of 156 pounds. He was fined 20% of his purse and his bout with Oliveira proceeded as scheduled at a catchweight.

COVID-19 pandemic
On March 12, the UFC announced that this event would take place behind closed doors (for the first time in the promotion's history) after Ibaneis Rocha, the governor of the Federal District (where Brasília is located), announced that large gatherings will be suspended or closed for a period of 5 days due to the COVID-19 pandemic. Both the UFC's planned Thursday media day and Friday ceremonial weigh-ins were cancelled ahead of the card, with the official early morning weigh-ins being the only official fighter obligations that remained ahead of fight night. In response, UFC president Dana White stated "We [The UFC] always go overboard with health and safety, and that’s what we’re going to do here", although none of the fighters were tested for the COVID-19 virus by the commission leading up to the event.

Results

Bonus awards
The following fighters received $50,000 bonuses.
Fight of the Night: Maryna Moroz vs. Mayra Bueno Silva
Performance of the Night: Charles Oliveira and Gilbert Burns

See also 

 List of UFC events
 List of current UFC fighters
 2020 in UFC

References 
 

UFC Fight Night
Mixed martial arts in Brazil
International sports competitions in Brasília
2020 in mixed martial arts
2020 in Brazilian sport
March 2020 sports events in Brazil
Impact of the COVID-19 pandemic on sports